Yeniyurt Castle is a castle ruin in Mersin Province, Turkey. The ancient name of the castle is not known. Yeniyurt is the name of a nearby village.

Geography 

The castle overviews the Kayacı valley and Limonlu River.

The castle 
The castle, now mostly in ruins, is noticeable for the non standard construction material. It was a Hellenistic castle built to control the valley during the ancient ages. But later on it was reconstructed  by the Byzantian Empire or the Cilician Armenia in the Medieval age. There are traces of three towers, a necropolis and a basilica as well as some houses.

References

 

History of Turkey
Ruined castles in Turkey
Archaeological sites in Mersin Province, Turkey
Forts in Turkey
Former populated places in Turkey
Castles in Mersin Province
Ancient Greek archaeological sites in Turkey
Byzantine fortifications in Turkey
Olba territorium